Margionys is a village in Dzukija National Park in Lithuania, located south-west of Marcinkonys. It is located 115 km away from Vilnius, 50 km away from Alytus and at the hand's reach from Druskininkai.

Back in the year 1637, Margionys had 11 households. Number of households in the village increased to 44 by the year 1889, with a total population of 271 individuals at the time. After the plague and wars, the village shrunk, with only two families living in it in 1738. By 1959, the village again had 261 inhabitants. This number has decreased to 98 in 1998 and 81 in 2003.

References

Villages in Alytus County
Varėna District Municipality